Bitis worthingtoni, also known commonly as the Kenya horned viper and the Kenyan horned viper, is a species of venomous snake in the subfamily Viperinae of the family Viperidae. The species is endemic Kenya. There are no subspecies that are recognized as being valid.

Etymology
The specific name, worthingtoni, is in honor of British zoologist Edgar Barton Worthington, collector of the first specimen.

Common names
Common names for B. worthingtoni include Kenya horned viper and Kenyan horned viper.

Description

Geographic range and habitat
The preferred natural habitats of B. worthingtoni are grassland, rocky areas, savanna, and shrubland. The type locality given for B. worthingtoni is the "shore of Lake Naivasha [Kenya]".

Reproduction
B. worthingtoni is viviparous.

Conservation status
In 2004, a proposal was submitted by Kenya to have B. worthingtoni listed on CITES Appendix II. The actual status of the species was unknown, but it was reasoned that the Kenyan proposal was justified due to the species' restricted geographic range, habitat loss, demand by reptile collectors and the existence of illegal trade. In 2019, B. worthingtoni was listed as "Vulnerable" by the International Union for Conservation of Nature.

References

Further reading
Fleck J (2003). "Bemerkungen zur Kenia-Hornpuffotter, Bitis worthingtoni, sowie Beobachtungen bei der Haltung und Vermehrung [= Comments on the Kenya puff adder, Bitis worthingtoni, with observations on its care and breeding]". Elaphe 8 (3): 20-23. (in German).
Parker HW (1932). "Scientific results of the Cambridge Expedition to the East African Lakes, 1930–1. — 5. Reptiles and Amphibians". Journal of the Linnean Society of London, Zoology 38: 213-229. (Bitis worthingtoni, new species, p. 221).
Spawls S, Howell K, Hinkel H, Menegon M (2018). Field Guide to East African Reptiles, Second Edition. London: Bloomsbury Natural History. 624 pp. . (Bitis worthingtoni, p. 581).

worthingoni
Snakes of Africa
Reptiles of Kenya
Endemic fauna of Kenya
Taxa named by Hampton Wildman Parker
Reptiles described in 1932